Peregrine Bertie may refer to:

Peregrine Bertie, 13th Baron Willoughby de Eresby (1555–1601)
Peregrine Bertie (MP for Lincolnshire) (born ), MP for Lincolnshire 1614
Peregrine Bertie (senior) (c. 1634–1701)
Peregrine Bertie (died 1711) (c. 1663–1711), Privy Counsellor and politician
Peregrine Bertie, 2nd Duke of Ancaster and Kesteven (1686–1742)
Peregrine Bertie, 3rd Duke of Ancaster and Kesteven (1714–1778)
Peregrine Bertie (of Low Leyton) (c. 1723–1786), MP for Westbury
Peregrine Bertie (naval officer) (1741–1790), Royal Navy officer and MP for Oxford